Austria sent a team to compete at the 2008 Summer Olympics in Beijing, China.

Medalists

Athletics

Men
Track & road events

Field events

Women
Track & road events

Canoeing

Slalom

Sprint

Qualification Legend: QS = Qualify to semi-final; QF = Qualify directly to final

Cycling

Road

Mountain biking

Diving

Men

Women

Equestrian

Dressage

Eventing

*Harald Ambros withdrew after the dressage competition because his horse suffered from an injury.

Fencing

Men

Gymnastics

Rhythmic

Judo

Men

Women

Sailing

Men

Women

Open

M = Medal race; EL = Eliminated – did not advance into the medal race; CAN = Race cancelled

Shooting

Men

Swimming

Men

Women

Synchronized swimming

Table tennis

All five singles players participated in the team events, with Veronika Heine completing the women's team and Daniel Habesohn as a reserve for the men's team.

Singles

Team

Tennis

Triathlon

Volleyball

Beach
Four Austrian beach volleyball teams had qualified for the Olympics, but the women's team Montagnolli - Swoboda was replaced by the Swiss team Kuhn - Schwer, because of medical reasons. There are now three beach volley teams in the games:

See also
 Austria at the 2008 Summer Paralympics

References

External links

Austria NOC

Nations at the 2008 Summer Olympics
2008
Summer Olympics